George Harrison: Living in the Material World is a 2011 documentary film co-produced and directed by Martin Scorsese, based on the life of George Harrison, musician and former member of the Beatles. It earned six nominations at the 64th Primetime Emmy Awards, winning two Emmy Awards for Outstanding Directing for Nonfiction Programming and Outstanding Nonfiction Special. A companion book was released alongside the film, as well as an album of Harrison's demo recordings called Early Takes: Volume 1.

Plot
The film follows musician George Harrison's story from his early life in Liverpool, the Beatlemania phenomenon, his travels to India, the influence of Krishna Consciousness movement in his music, and his relevance and importance as a member of the Beatles. It consists of previously unseen footage and interviews with Olivia and Dhani Harrison, friends, and many others.

Appearances

Production
After Harrison's death in 2001, various production companies approached his widow Olivia about producing a film about her late husband's life. She declined because he had wanted to tell his own life story through his video archive. Upon meeting Scorsese, she gave her blessings and signed on to the film project as a producer.

According to Scorsese, he was attracted to the project because "That subject matter has never left me...The more you're in the material world, the more there is a tendency for a search for serenity and a need to not be distracted by physical elements that are around you. His music is very important to me, so I was interested in the journey that he took as an artist. The film is an exploration. We don't know. We're just feeling our way through."

Throughout 2008 and 2009, Scorsese alternated working between Shutter Island and the documentary. Scorsese, his editor David Tedeschi, and a small army of researchers spent five years assembling interviews, music, film clips, photos, and memorabilia.

Release
The documentary premièred at the Foundation for Art and Creative Technology in Liverpool on 2 October 2011. It was shown on HBO in two parts on 5 and 6 October 2011 in the United States and Canada and as a two-part Arena special on BBC Two on 12 and 13 November 2011 in the United Kingdom. It was first theatrically released in Australia on 20 October 2011.

Deluxe edition CD

All songs written by George Harrison, except where noted.

"My Sweet Lord" (Demo) – 3:33
"Run of the Mill" (Demo) – 1:56
"I'd Have You Anytime" (Early Take) (George Harrison, Bob Dylan) – 3:06
"Mama, You've Been on My Mind" (Demo) (Bob Dylan) – 3:04
"Let It Be Me" (Demo) (Gilbert Bécaud, Mann Curtis, Pierre Delanoë) – 2:56
"Woman Don't You Cry for Me" (Early Take) – 2:44
"Awaiting on You All" (Early Take) – 2:40
"Behind That Locked Door" (Demo) – 3:29
"All Things Must Pass" (Demo) – 4:38
"The Light That Has Lighted the World" (Demo) – 2:23

Book
Olivia Harrison authored an accompanying book, titled George Harrison: Living in the Material World and published by Abrams in 2011. The book was edited by Mark Holborn and contains a foreword by Scorsese and an introduction by author and literary critic Paul Theroux.

Response

Box office
George Harrison: Living in the Material World grossed $0 in the United States and Canada, and a worldwide total of $367,734.

Critical reception
The film holds  approval rating at Rotten Tomatoes, based on  professional reviews, with an average rating of 7.5/10. The website's critics consensus reads, "Clocking in at nearly three and a half hours, George Harrison: Living in the Material World is a moving portrait of the so-called Quiet Beatle's spirituality and troubled existence that highlights the best of Scorsese's sensibilities." On Metacritic, the film holds a score of 74 out of 100, based on 13 critics, indicating "generally favorable reviews".

Accolades
The documentary earned two Primetime Emmy Awards, Outstanding Nonfiction Special and Outstanding Directing for Nonfiction Programming for director Martin Scorsese. It also earned nominations for Outstanding Cinematography, Picture Editing, Sound Editing, and Sound Mixing.

References

External links

2011 films
American biographical films
Documentary films about the Beatles
Films directed by Martin Scorsese
Films produced by Martin Scorsese
George Harrison
Primetime Emmy Award-winning broadcasts
2010s English-language films
2010s American films